Sami Juaim  (Arabic: سامي جعيم) (born 3 May 1986) is a Yemeni football forward. He was a member of the Yemen national under-17 football team at the 2003 FIFA U-17 World Championship in Finland.

Honours

Club
Al-Ahli San'a

Yemeni League: 1
 2006–07

Country
Yemen U17
FIFA U-17 World Cup
Group Stage: 2003
 AFC U-17 Championship
Runner-up: 2002 AFC U-17 Championship

International goals

External links 
 

1986 births
Living people
Yemeni footballers
Yemen international footballers
Association football forwards
Al-Ahli Club Sana'a players
Al Sha'ab Sana'a players
Yemeni League players